Eupogonius infimus is a species of beetle in the family Cerambycidae. It was described by Thomson in 1868. It is known from Panama, Mexico, and Venezuela.

References

Eupogonius
Beetles described in 1868